The 1937 SMU Mustangs football team was an American football team that represented Southern Methodist University (SMU) as a member of the Southwest Conference (SWC) during the 1937 college football season. In their third season under head coach Matty Bell, the Mustangs compiled a 5–6 record (2–4 against conference opponents) and outscored opponents by a total of 93 to 80. The team played its home games at Ownby Stadium in University Park, Texas, and the Cotton Bowl in Dallas.

Tackle Charles Sprague received first-team honors from the Associated Press on the 1937 All-Southwest Conference football team.

Schedule

References

SMU
SMU Mustangs football seasons
SMU Mustangs football